An anti-tank missile carrier is an armored vehicle which serves as a tank destroyer utilizing anti-tank guided missiles, specifically designed for tactical situations demanding anti-tank warfare.

Some examples of such a vehicle include:
 Humber Hornet — Australia/United Kingdom
 NAMICA — India
 NM142 — Norway
 Ratel ZT-3 — South Africa
 FV438 Swingfire — United Kingdom
 FV102 Striker — United Kingdom
 M1134 Anti-Tank Guided Missile Vehicle — United States
 M901 ITV — United States
 Pereh - Israel

See also
 Tank destroyers
 Anti-tank warfare

Tank destroyers